Spiropentadiene, or bowtiediene, is a hydrocarbon with formula C5H4. The simplest spiro-connected cycloalkene, it is very unstable—decomposing even below −100 °C—due to its high bond strain and does not occur in nature. Its synthesis was reported in 1991.

Synthesis
Spiropentadiene was synthesised from bistrimethylsilylpropynone 1 by reaction with p-toluenesulfonylhydrazide to tosylhydrazone 2 followed by treatment with sodium cyanoborohydride to allene 3 and followed by two successive reactions with chlorocarbene generated from methyllithium and dichloromethane to spiro compound 5. Spiropentadiene was trapped in a liquid nitrogen trap after reaction with TBAF in a double elimination reaction.

Derivatives
The derivative dichlorospiropentadiene has been reported. An all-silicon derivative (Si5 frame, (tBuMe2Si)3Si side groups) is also known. In contrast to the carbon parent this compound is stable with a melting point of 216 to 218 °C. The angle between the two rings as measured by X-ray single-crystal analysis is 78°.

References

Cyclopropenes
Spiro compounds
Dienes
Polycyclic nonaromatic hydrocarbons
Substances discovered in the 1990s